Bream Wood is a  biological Site of Special Scientific Interest north of Crowborough in East Sussex.

This steep sided valley wood has several locally rare ferns and mosses. There are a number of small ponds and acid springs and flora include the rare moss Dicranodontium denudatum at one of only two known locations in south-east England.  The dry upper slopes have ancient woodland.

The site is private land with no public access.

References

Sites of Special Scientific Interest in East Sussex
Rotherfield